XHHP-FM (branded as La Más Prendida) is a Spanish-language radio station in Ciudad Victoria, Tamaulipas.

History
XEHP-AM 580 received its concession on October 23, 1956. It was owned by Alfonso Flores López and broadcast with 1,000 watts during the day and 150 at night. Enrique Cárdenas González, from the family that founded ORT, bought XEHP in 1977; it was transferred to Victoria Radio Publicidad in 1991 and migrated to FM in 2011.

References

Radio stations in Ciudad Victoria
Radio stations established in 1966